The National Assembly is Mauritius's unicameral legislature, which was called the Legislative Assembly until 1992, when the country became a republic. The Constitution of Mauritius provides for the parliament of Mauritius to consist of the President and the National Assembly. The parliament of Mauritius is modelled after the Westminster system of parliamentary democracy, where members of parliament are voted in at regular general elections, on the basis of a first past the post system. The working language of the National Assembly is English.

It consists of 70 members, 62 directly elected for five-year terms in multi-member constituencies and 8 additional members, known as "best losers", appointed by the Electoral Supervisory Commission to ensure that ethnic and religious minorities are equitably represented. The Government is primarily responsible to the National Assembly and the prime minister stays in office with the confidence of a majority of its members.

Constitutional role
The National Assembly is supreme and determines the functioning of various constitutional institutions of the country.

President
The President of Mauritius and Vice-President of Mauritius are both elected by the assembly for a five-year term.

Government
The National Assembly is essential to determine which party/group forms the government and therefore the executive of the country. As per the constitution, the prime minister is answerable to and must maintain the support of the assembly. Thus, whenever the office of prime minister falls vacant, the president appoints the person who has the support of the House, or who is most likely to command the support of the House—normally the leader of the largest party in the assembly.

Opposition
The political party or alliance which has the second largest majority forms the Official Opposition and its leader is normally nominated by the President of the Republic as the Leader of the Opposition.

Composition
The Assembly is made of up of 70 members, of whom 62 are directly elected in 21 constituencies. The island of Mauritius is divided into 20 constituencies returning three members each and that of Rodrigues is a single constituency returning two members. After a general election, the Electoral Supervisory Commission may nominate up to a maximum of 8 additional members in accordance with section 5 of the First Schedule of the Constitution with a view to correct any imbalance in community representation in Parliament. This system of nominating members is commonly called the best loser system.

The political party or party alliance which wins the majority of seats in the Assembly forms the government and its leader usually becomes the Prime Minister. It is the Prime Minister who selects the members of the composition of the Cabinet from elected members of the Assembly, except for the Attorney General, who may not be an elected member of the Assembly.

List of political parties represented in the Assembly
A new assembly was elected on December 10, 2014 and a new coalition government was appointed with Sir Anerood Jugnauth as prime minister. The following political parties are represented in the assembly (based on the number of MPs):

Procedures
After a new assembly is elected, the President, by proclamation, may open the new session fixing the date and time of the sitting. The government message (replacing the speech of the throne) is read by the President. The Assembly normally sits on Tuesdays as from 11:30 AM when it is in session. The President acting on the advice of the prime minister may at any time adjourn, prorogue or dissolve the assembly.

Officials/functions of the Assembly
The following positions/body have important functions in the assembly. They are as follows:

 The Speaker – the main function of the Speaker is to ensure that the Standing Orders and Rules of the National Assembly are complied with. The Speaker interprets and enforces the Standing Orders and for the purpose of interpretation, recourse is often had to Erskine May: Parliamentary Practice, responds to Members' points of order and give rulings when necessary. The Speaker symbolizes the authority of Parliament.
 The Deputy Speaker – the deputy speaker assists and acts as the speaker when the latter is out of office. 
 The Leader of the House (Prime Minister) – the president acting on the advice of the prime minister may at any time adjourn, prorogue or dissolve the assembly. 
 The Leader of the Opposition – the office holder is usually to level criticism against the policy and administration of Government and to outline the alternative policies. 
 The Attorney General – the office holder is the national legal adviser to the government and the assembly. 
 The Government Chief Whip – along with the Opposition whip, sets the agenda for the parliamentary work. 
 The Opposition Whip – along with the Chief Whip, sets the agenda for the parliamentary work. 
 The Government Deputy Chief Whip – replaces the Chief Whip when the latter is out of office. 
 The Chairperson of Public Accounts Committee
 The Deputy Chairperson of Committees
 The Clerk
 The Mace – symbol of authority
 The Serjeant-At-Arms
 The Secretariat
 The Library
 The parliamentary reporters

See also
List of speakers of the National Assembly of Mauritius
Politics of Mauritius
List of legislatures by country

References

External links

Mauritius
Government of Mauritius
Mauritius
Mauritius
1958 establishments in Mauritius
1992 establishments in Mauritius